Wil Hartog (born 28 May 1948) is a Dutch former professional Grand Prix motorcycle road racer. He competed in the Grand Prix motorcycle racing world championships from 1970 to 1981. Hartog was the first Dutch competitor to win a 500cc Grand Prix race.



Motorcycle racing career
Born in Abbekerk, North Holland, Hartog became the first Dutchman to win a 500cc Grand Prix when he claimed a victory at the 1977 Dutch TT. That victory earned him a ride with the Suzuki factory team as a teammate to Barry Sheene. Hartog won five Grands Prix during his career. Standing over 1,80 meters tall, he was at a disadvantage against his jockey-sized competitors yet he still managed impressive results. With his penchant for wearing all white riding apparel, he was nicknamed The White Giant.

To commemorate the fortieth anniversary of his 1977 Dutch TT victory, Hartog was honored during the 2017 Dutch TT by riding a lap of the Assen TT circuit on the motorcycle he won on, accompanied by Freddie Sheene, the son of Hartog's late teammate, on one of his father's motorcycles.

Career statistics

Grand Prix motorcycle racing

Races by year
(key) (Races in bold indicate pole position) (Races in italics indicate fastest lap)

References 

1948 births
Living people
Dutch motorcycle racers
350cc World Championship riders
500cc World Championship riders
People from Noorder-Koggenland
Sportspeople from North Holland
20th-century Dutch people